Khawla Hamdi is a Tunisian-born Arabic-language author born on July 12, 1984 in Tunis, Tunisia. She is a professor at the King Saud University in Riyadh, where she teaches Information technology and currently resides in Riyadh. She has several best-selling novels in her literary career.

Educations
She has a degree in Industrial Engineering and received her Master's degree in Management from school of management in Saint-Étienne, France in 2008. In 2011, she obtained a Ph.D. of Applied mathematics in Operations research branch from University of Technology of Troyes, France.

Entering the authorship field
Khawla Hamdi entered the writing world with the book "Ahlam al-Shabab". The book, which reflects the memories of a Muslim girl, was published in 320 pages in Arabic in 2006.

Thereafter, her second book entitled In My Heart A Jewish Girl was published in Arabic in 2012. Inspired by a true story, the book tells the story of a Tunisian Jewish girl who converted to Islam, after being influenced by the character of an orphan Muslim girl and becomes interested in a young Lebanese who is one of the Lebanese resistance forces. This book is known as one of the best-selling novels and has been reprinted more than 47 times so far.

Then the book Ghorbat Al Yasmeen “The Expatriation of Jasmine” was published by this author in 2015. This book is mostly about the problems of Arab refugees in France.

An Tabqa “To Stay” was Khawla Hamdi's next book, published in 2016. The novel focuses on the problems of Arab refugees in Europe and their dual identities.

Her next book was Ayn Al Mafar “Where to Escape!”, which was published in 2018. This book scrutinize the revolutions that have taken place in the Arab world, especially Tunisia, as a story.

Bibliography

Ahlam al-Shabab “Dreams of Youths”
This book has been published in Arabic and in novel form. This book is about the desires and aspirations of young people and portrays the memories of a Muslim girl.

Part of the novel: My Name is Maram, I'm in my 20s, a medical student... I've been in college for two years, a lot of things has changed in my life, have you grown up? Maybe! But I'm sure that intellectual maturity doesn't have much to do with age... Maybe there have been some changes in my life that make me feel the difference. Yes, the environment has changed, friends and acquaintances have changed, I have lost some of my friends and made new friends... Life does not stop and goes on... But that's not all because I'm writing my own memories! Every part of life is important and has a particular value to me, because I see that every individual is inherently distinct, because Almighty God created him or her different from other people, so every individual is exceptional and can only exist once, and this experience is unique... It seems we got into philosophical talk and got away from topic. Let's go back to the subject... Hmmm, what made me write my memoir? Yes...

This book was published in Arabic in 320 pages in 2006.

Fi Qalbi Ontha Ebrya “In My Heart A Jewish Girl”
The book Fi Qalbi Ontha Ebrya has been published in both Arabic and Persian. This book illustrates many contemporary issues in the Arab world such as misunderstanding about Islam and Hijab.

The story revolves around Rima, a Tunisian Muslim girl who her parents died. Her mother's last words to her Jewish neighbor, Jacob, are to raise Rima as a Muslim. Jacob accepts Rima's care and Rima, a teenage girl, grows up and starts wearing Islamic veil. Jacob's wife, Tanya, who cannot tolerates with Rima's veil and finds that her Jewish children are also interested in Islamic veil because of Rima, sees Rima as a threat to her children and asks Jacob to choose between Rima and her family. As a result, Jacob sends Rima to his sister Rachel's home in Lebanon. There, Rachel's husband mistreated Rima then she forced to move. Afterwards, she becomes acquainted with Nada and becomes one of the agents of his conversion to Islam. A love story about coexistence between religions.

This book was published in Arabic in 388 pages in 2012.

Ghorbat Al Yasmeen “The Expatriation of Jasmine”
This book has been published in Arabic and in novel form. The novel discusses about how could be difficult for Arab and Muslim refugees to adapt themselves with French society. The main character in this novel is a Muslim girl who wears a head scarf and faces problems because of it in society.

This book was published in Arabic in 407 pages in 2015.

Excerpt from the book: When she was asked first time about the journey ahead, her mother, Fatima, responded indirectly to her by these statements. She told her about Yasmeen's flower, which her name comes from it. She said Yasmeen's flower is always convinced to the least. This plant does not need much care. A single drop of fertilizer per each spring is enough for it. Suffice it to be slightly moist, then no irrigation is needed. All types of jasmine flowers prefer to grow in a sunny place but also tolerate the presence of shade. The Tunisian sun is suitable for blossoming and completing personality of this flower, but it has the ability to withstand the shade and cold climate of Europe. Like the Mediterranean white jasmine, which is very delicate in appearance but strong in character. Yasmeen's unique fragrance conveys a sense of sincerity that other roses lack.
She did not ask about the importance of the emotions that this flower brings. She knew that giving a woman a jasmine flower sometimes meant, "Why didn't you ever love me?" Just as her father had given her, Yasmeen, to her mother. It was her father's last gift to her mother because he had been evading custody of Yasmeen after divorce. After that, her mother never accepted anyone's love because she had dedicated herself to love for Yasmeen.She increasingly felt the absence of his mother more day after day. Over time, she became more confident that she would be lost without him. She knew that being a foreigner was not an easy experience. However, he had agreed to take the trip. Her mother had taught him how to be a real jasmine, but she may have overlooked the bitter truth: When it leaves its soil, Jasmine quickly fades away and wraps itself beautifully in the dry.

An Tabqa “To Stay”
This book has been published in Arabic and in novel form. The novel discusses about the hardships of immigration of Muslims and whether it is worth it.

This book was published in Arabic in 383 pages in 2016.

Part of the text of the book: Everything was cool and exciting until I decided to make a change in my desperate path and do something extraordinary to get me out of this absurdity hell. After that, in one of the autumn night, when I stepped on the boat that had stopped on the shore, the moonlight has faded from my life, and my life became a improvisations series of exceptional cases. From then on, I went through different adventures and endangered my life many times. I became close to the borders of death by drowning and deprived myself of justice, I even almost fell into the realm of the dead. Over and over, I found myself hoping to return to a monotonous life with no excitement. I was scared to be forgotten in a corner and die alone. I was afraid that I had ruined my normal life for nothing!

Ayn Al Mafar “Where to Escape!”
This book has been published in Arabic and in novel form. The novel mainly scrutinizes the Tunisian revolution and the effects that these failed revolutions have on the people.

This is part of the text: If she could paint a simple picture of her life, of course if she had been so aware, she recognized that it was all just suffering. Each suffering depicts a different path, expressing certain meanings that she was unaware of it... Every suffering had to search for the next suffering to find its way... In the meantime she was looking for a way to get rid of it and always asked: Which event, like a tornado, shook the pillars of her monotonous life?... Just when there was an incentive to keep going, everything seemed void to her... Like a fisherman who fished a fish then thrown it into the sea and wait for a bigger fish...

This book has been published in Arabic in 431 pages in 2018.

See also
 In My Heart A Hebrew Girl
 Rabee Jaber
 The Mehlis Report (book)
 Scriptural reasoning

References

External links 
 Khawla Hamdi on Kayan publishing website
 Khawla Hamdi on goodreads.com
 In My Heart A Jewish Girl (Arabic) by Khawla Hamdi
 Khawla Hamdi on foulabook.com
 “A Jewish Girl” comes to Iranian bookstores

1984 births
Living people
Writers from Tunis
Tunisian emigrants to France
Tunisian novelists